Iqbal Hasan Mahmud, also known as Tuku, is a Bangladesh Nationalist Party politician and a former state minister of power and agriculture during 2001–2006.

Early life and background
Mahmud was born into a Bengali Muslim family of Taluqdars in the village of Koyelgati in Sheyalkol Union, Sirajganj which was formerly in Pabna District, Pakistan. His father was Abdullah al Mahmood, a noted politician and former minister in East Pakistan, and his grandfather was Derazuddin Taluqdar.

Career
Mahmud served as the State Minister of Power in the Bangladesh Nationalist Party government from 2001 to 2006. Bangladesh Anti Corruption Commission on 21 March 2007 filed a case, accusing him of accumulating 25 million taka through illegal means. On 15 November 2007, he was sentenced by a special court to nine years in jail in the case. He filed an appeal against the verdict in December 2007. On 16 June 2011, he was acquitted in Bangladesh High Court. On 4 December 2011 the Anti Corruption commission filed an appeal against the verdict. His acquittal was scrapped in the Appellate Division on 27 January 2014. He filed an appeal which was disposed in 2016 and a new hearing ordered in the Appellate Division.

Family
Mahmud was the eldest son of Abdullah al Mahmood, Minister of Industries and Natural Resources of Pakistan, and the brother-in-law of former Deputy Prime Minister of Bangladesh M.A. Matin. His daughter is married to a son of Awami League politician Sheikh Selim.

References

Living people
Bangladesh Nationalist Party politicians
3rd Jatiya Sangsad members
8th Jatiya Sangsad members
State Ministers of Power, Energy and Mineral Resources
State Ministers of Agriculture (Bangladesh)
Year of birth missing (living people)
21st-century Bengalis
20th-century Bengalis
Bangladeshi Sunni Muslims
People from Sirajganj Sadar Upazila